Fire on the Mountain is a 1981 American neo-Western drama television film directed by Donald Wrye and written by John Sacret Young, based on the 1962 novel of the same name by Edward Abbey. The film stars Buddy Ebsen as John Vogelin and Ron Howard as Lee Mackie. It originally aired on NBC on November 23, 1981.

Cast
 Buddy Ebsen as John Vogelin
 Ron Howard as Lee Mackie
 Julie Carmen as Cruza Peralta
 Ross Harris as Billy Starr
 Ed Brodow as Major Parrell
 Michael Conrad as Colonel Desalius
 Gary Graham as Marshal Burr
 Richard Chaves as Lieutenant
 Harvey Vernon as Bartender
 Will Hare as Hayduke

Awards and nominations

References

External links
 
 

1981 films
1981 drama films
1981 television films
1981 Western (genre) films
1980s English-language films
American Western (genre) films
Films based on American novels
Films directed by Donald Wrye
Films scored by Basil Poledouris
Films set in New Mexico
Carson Productions films
NBC network original films
Neo-Western films
American drama television films
Western (genre) television films
Television films based on books
1980s American films